Straža is a settlement on the Idrijca River southwest of Cerkno in the traditional Littoral region of Slovenia.

The local church is dedicated to the Conversion of Paul and belongs to the Parish of Cerkno.

References

External links
Straža on Geopedia

Populated places in the Municipality of Cerkno